Miss USA 2015 was the 64th Miss USA pageant, held at the Raising Cane's River Center Arena in Baton Rouge, Louisiana on July 12, 2015. All fifty states and the District of Columbia competed. Nia Sanchez of Nevada crowned her successor Olivia Jordan of Oklahoma at the end of the event. This was Oklahoma's first Miss USA title in the pageant's history.

The pageant was broadcast on Reelz after remarks made by Miss Universe Organization owner Donald Trump regarding Mexican immigrants during Trump's speech announcing his candidacy for the Republican nomination for U.S. President on June 16, 2015, in New York City led NBC, which had broadcast the pageant since 2003, and incumbent rights holders Univision Communications and Televisa to terminate their relationships with the Organization and Trump himself. It was also affected by many of the originally announced hosts, judges and musical performers pulling out in protest. Miss USA generated a unique Twitter audience of 2.42 million, according to Nielsen Social, No. 1 among entertainment series and specials during the week ended July 12.

Entertainment correspondent Alex Wehrley, a former Miss Wisconsin USA 2009, was brought in to host the pageant alongside game show host Todd Newton after original hosts Cheryl Burke of Dancing with the Stars and MSNBC anchor Thomas Roberts withdrew.

This was the only Miss USA to be aired on Reelz and this was the last edition that Donald Trump had been the owner. This was also the first pageant since 1964 to take place in the month of July.

Background

Selection of contestants
Delegates from 50 states and the District of Columbia were chosen in state pageants held from July 2014 to January 2015. The first state pageant was Florida, held on July 12, 2014, and the final pageants were New Hampshire and New York, both held on January 18, 2015; nine of these delegates were former Miss Teen USA state winners, two of them were former Miss America state winners and one is former Miss World America who competed at Miss World 2013.

Results

Placements

§ Voted into Top 11 after the swimsuit competition by the public .

Awards

Order of announcements

Top 15

Top 11

Top 5

Historical significance 
 Oklahoma wins competition for the first time and surpasses its previous highest placement in 2010. Also becoming in the 34th state who does it for the first time.
 Texas earns the 1st runner-up position for the sixth time. The last time it placed this was in 1983. Also this was reached its highest placement since 2011.
 Rhode Island earns the 2nd runner-up position for the second time. The last time it placed this was in 1973. Also this was reached its highest placement since Olivia Culpo won in 2012. Ironically, Culpo went on to be the eighth American woman winning the Miss Universe title in 2012.
 Nevada earns the 3rd runner-up position for the second time. The last time it placed this was in 2012. Also this was reached its highest placement since Nia Sanchez won in the previous year.
 Maryland earns the 4th runner-up position for the second time. The last time it placed this was in 1973. Also this was reached its highest placement since Nana Meriwether in 2012.
 States that placed in semifinals the previous year were Alabama, Arizona, Louisiana, Maryland, Nevada, Oklahoma and Virginia. 
 Alabama placed for the sixth consecutive year.
 Maryland  placed for the fifth consecutive year.
 Louisiana and Nevada placed for the fourth consecutive year.
 Arizona, Oklahoma and Virginia made their second consecutive placement.
 Illinois and Texas last placed in 2013.
 Michigan and Rhode Island last placed in 2012.
 Hawaii and New York last placed in 2011.
 Kentucky last placed in 2009.
 Delaware reached the Top 15 for the first time in history;  With this, all states have placed at least once in semifinals.  It also became the last state to placed itself in the semifinals.
 California and Pennsylvania, break an ongoing streak of placements since 2013.
 South Carolina breaks an ongoing streak of placements since 2011.
 This is the fourth year in a row a state wins its first Miss USA title (Oklahoma, Nevada, Connecticut, and Rhode Island), including Culpo's win in 2012.

Pageant

Preliminary round
Prior to the final telecast, the delegates compete in the preliminary competition, which involves private interviews with the judges and a presentation show where they compete in swimsuit and evening gown. It was held on July 10, 2015, on the official Miss USA YouTube channel and was hosted by Nick Teplitz and Nia Sanchez.

Judges
 Alison Taub
 B. J. Coleman
 Daurius Baptist
 Fred Nelson
 Jennifer Palpallatoc
 Lori Lung
 Maureen Storto

Finals
The format reverted to top 15, as it was in 2013, during the final competition, the top fifteen semifinalists competed in swimsuit, 10 of the 15 semifinalists were chosen by the judges, while one was chosen for a public vote, as they competed in evening gown, before five were chosen to advance. The top 5 competed in the final question round signed up by a panel of judges and a final runway, the winner was decided by a panel of judges alongside the four runners-up.

Judges
 Tara Conner – Miss USA 2006 from Kentucky
 Rima Fakih – Miss USA 2010 from Michigan
 Crystle Stewart – Miss USA 2008 from Texas
 Nana Meriwether – Miss USA 2012 from Maryland
 Kimberly Pressler – Miss USA 1999 from New York
 Danielle Doty – Miss Teen USA 2011 from Texas
 Leila Lopes – Miss Universe 2011 from Angola
 Brook Lee – Miss Universe 1997 from United States
 Michelle McLean – Miss Universe 1992 from Namibia

Contestants
51 delegates have been confirmed:

Controversy
On June 25, 2015, Univision Communications president and CEO Randy Falco announced that the company would terminate its contract to broadcast Spanish language coverage of the 2015 Miss USA pageant (which was set to air on UniMás) and sever its business ties with Miss Universe Organization co-owner Donald Trump, following comments regarding illegal Mexican immigrants that were made by Trump during his speech announcing his candidacy for the Republican Party nomination for President of the United States on June 16, in which Trump stated that illegal Mexicans immigrating into the U.S. were responsible for importing drugs, and bringing crime, rapists, and drug dealers into the country, and called for the building of a wall along the Mexico–United States border. Chilean actor Cristián de la Fuente and Puerto Rican actress Roselyn Sánchez, who were both slated to host the Spanish language broadcast of the pageant, also announced that they were pulling out of the telecast, citing their offense to Trump's comments. Colombian reggaeton singer J Balvin, who was scheduled to make his first musical performance on mainstream U.S. television, also announced that he would also no longer participate in the event. Miss Universe 2006 Zuleyka Rivera of Puerto Rico, who was set to judge the pageant, announced she would no longer participate as well.

In a statement by Univision regarding its decision, Falco cited the consideration of the views of its predominately Hispanic broadcast audience and corporate employee base, that "[Univision] see[s] first-hand the work ethic, love for family, strong religious values and the important role Mexican immigrants and Mexican-Americans have had and will continue to have in building the future of our country." Following the announcement of the company's decision, a lawyer for Trump stated that he is strongly considering taking legal action against Univision Communications for its refusal to carry the Miss USA telecast, alleging it violated the terms of the five-year broadcast and co-production agreement for the Miss USA and Miss Universe pageants that Univision signed with the Miss Universe Organization five months earlier on February 5. Trump himself accused the Government of Mexico, among other parties, of "putting tremendous pressure on Univision to break their signed and fully effective contract with the Miss Universe Organization" because of his statements "exposing to the public, and the world, the terrible and costly trade deals that the United States is incompetently making with Mexico".

Univision noted that despite the decision by its entertainment division to terminate its business relationship with the Miss Universe Organization, its news division and owned-and-operated broadcast outlets would continue to provide coverage of Trump and all other presidential candidates during the 2016 presidential campaign "to ensure our audience continues to have access to all points of view". On June 26, Trump notified Falco that Univision employees would no longer be allowed to enter or hold membership with the Trump National Doral Miami golf course, which abuts Univision's corporate headquarters in Doral, Florida. That same day on his Instagram account, Trump also released personal correspondence from Univision anchor Jorge Ramos – containing Ramos' personal work mobile phone number, which was unobscured in the image – requesting an interview with Trump.

On June 29, NBCUniversal, which owns the 50% stake in the Miss Universe Organization not owned by Donald Trump, confirmed it was terminating its business ties with Trump – saying in a statement that "respect and dignity for all people are cornerstones of our values" – and would no longer air the Miss USA and Miss Universe pageants (Miss Teen USA has not aired on conventional television since the 2007 pageant, as it was not included in NBC's renewed television contract with the Miss Universe Organization for uncited reasons; Trump was also dismissed as host of The Celebrity Apprentice, which NBC will continue to air as United Artists Media Group holds the licensing rights to the reality competition series). Mexican media conglomerate Televisa also announced it would cut ties to Trump and end its television contract with the Miss Universe Organization. In a June 29 interview with the Kansas City Star, Miss Kansas USA 2015 Alexis Railsback – who is of Mexican American descent – said that it was "really unfortunate and kind of unfair that the Miss USA pageant is kind of taking the brunt for Donald Trump's speech". Noting that the Miss Universe Organization is a standalone entity, she iterated that Trump "does not organize the pageant, [and] does not run what goes on" and that she believes the fallout stemming from the remarks is not "really related to the pageant in any way, other than the fact that he is the co-owner". Following the decision, some pageant contestants and supporters backed a Change.org petition and used the hashtag #SavetheSash on social media and on a video posted to the pageant's official Facebook page, urging NBC to reconsider their decision not to air Miss USA.

On June 30, Thomas Roberts (who serves as an anchor for NBCUniversal-owned MSNBC) and Cheryl Burke pulled out of hosting the pageant, with Burke citing her opposition to Trump's comments and the network's decision to stop telecasting the event. After reports indicated that Miss Teen USA broadcasters Ustream and Xbox Live, as well as Netflix had showed interest in obtaining the streaming rights to the event, the Miss Universe Organization later confirmed on June 30 that the pageant would be streamed on the official Miss USA website (a subpage of the Organization's website).

After previously indicating that he may sue Univision and NBCUniversal, Trump and the Miss Universe Organization filed a breach of contract and defamation lawsuit against Univision Communications in the New York Supreme Court on June 30, seeking damages in excess of $500 million. Univision responded to the suit in a statement, calling the complaint "both factually false and legally ridiculous," and that it "will not only vigorously defend the case, but will continue to fight against Mr. Trump's ongoing efforts to run away from the derogatory comments he made on June 16th about illegal Mexican immigrants." On June 30, a rep for singer Natalie La Rose announced that she had withdrawn from performing at the pageant; La Rose was joined on July 1 by judges Emmitt Smith and Jonathan Scott, country singer Craig Wayne Boyd and rapper Flo Rida in dropping out of the pageant. Jeannie Mai, who originally announced that she would stay on as a co-host, stating that while she "do[es] not condone Mr. Trump's statements[...] I can't abandon these women when they need our support now more than ever", citing the Miss Universe Organization's mission to "unite women from all over the world and celebrate different cultures", announced on July 6, 2015, that she was withdrawing as co-host. All of them including Miss Universe 2006 Zuleyka Rivera of Puerto Rico are interested to participate and be a part of Miss Earth beauty contest.

On July 2, the Miss Universe Organization reached an agreement with Reelz to broadcast Miss USA 2015 on the digital cable channel. In a statement, Stanley Hubbard, CEO of Reelz parent Hubbard Broadcasting, said "As one of only a few independent networks, we decided to exercise our own voice and committed ourselves to bringing this pageant to American viewers everywhere." Even with the announcement of a new broadcaster for the 2015 event, a webcast of the pageant was still available via the Miss USA website (which was also viewable on smartphones, tablets and on video game consoles via their respective YouTube applications) for those not able to watch on Reelz due to the channel's absence of availability on several cable providers (such as Cox Communications) or because they do not subscribe to Reelz through a participating carrier of the channel. Baton Rouge's This TV affiliate KBTR-CD simulcast the pageant using Reelz' feed.

Notes

References

External links

 Miss USA official website
 

2015
July 2015 events in the United States
USA
Beauty pageants in the United States
2015 in Louisiana